Bugulina is a genus of bryozoans in the family Bugulidae.

Species
, the World List of Bryozoa accepted the following species:

 Bugulina angustiloba 
 Bugulina aquilirostris 
 Bugulina avicularia 
 Bugulina borealis 
 Bugulina calathus 
 Bugulina californica 
 Bugulina carvalhoi 
 Bugulina ditrupae 
 Bugulina eburnea 
 Bugulina flabellata 
 Bugulina foliolata 
 Bugulina fulva 
 Bugulina hummelincki 
 Bugulina longirostrata 
 Bugulina multiserialis 
 Bugulina pedata 
 Bugulina pugeti 
 Bugulina simplex 
 Bugulina spicata 
 Bugulina stolonifera 
 Bugulina tricuspis 
 Bugulina turbinata

References

Bryozoan genera